Yukon is in the northwestern corner of Canada and is bordered by Alaska and the Northwest Territories.  The sparsely populated territory abounds with natural scenic beauty, with snowmelt lakes and perennial white-capped mountains, including many of Canada's highest mountains. The territory's climate is Arctic in territory north of Old Crow, subarctic in the region, between Whitehorse and Old Crow, and humid continental climate south of Whitehorse and in areas close to the British Columbia border. Most of the territory is boreal forest with tundra being the main vegetation zone only in the extreme north and at high elevations.

The territory is about the shape of a right triangle, bordering the American state of Alaska to the west, the Northwest Territories to the east and British Columbia to the south. Yukon covers 482,443 km2, of which 474,391 km2 is land and 8,052 km2 is water, making it the forty-first largest subnational entity in the world, and, among the fifty largest, the least populous.

Yukon is bounded on the south by the 60th parallel of latitude. Its northern coast is on the Beaufort Sea. Its western boundary is 141° west longitude. Its ragged eastern boundary mostly follows the divide between the Yukon River Basin and the Mackenzie River watershed to the east in the Mackenzie mountains.

Physical geography
Except for the coastal plain on the Beaufort Sea (Arctic Ocean) coast, most of Yukon is part of the American cordillera. The terrain includes mountain ranges, plateaus and river valleys.

The southwest is dominated by the Kluane icefields in Kluane National Park and Reserve, the largest non-polar icefields in the Poles. Kluane National Park also contains eight of Canada's ten highest mountains, including the five highest, all in the Saint Elias Mountains. A number of glaciers flow out of the icefields, including the Logan Glacier, the Hubbard Glacier and the Kaskawulsh Glacier.

Permafrost is common. The northern part of Yukon has continuous permafrost, while it is widespread in the central part. Even the southern Yukon has scattered patches of permafrost.

Two major faults, the Denali Fault and the Tintina Fault have created major valleys called trenches: the Shakwak Trench and the Tintina Trench. The Shakwak Trench separates the Kluane ranges from other mountain ranges north of it. The Haines Highway and the Alaska Highway north of Haines Junction are built in the Shakwak Trench. The Tintina Trench bisects the Yukon from northwest to southeast and its edges have rich mineral deposits including the Klondike gold and the lead-zinc deposits near Faro.

Volcanoes 
The volcanoes in Yukon are part of the circle of volcanoes around the Pacific Ocean known as the Pacific Ring of Fire. Yukon includes more than 100 separate volcanic centres that have been active during the Quaternary. The Fort Selkirk Volcanic Field in central Yukon is the northernmost Holocene volcanic field in Canada, including the young active cinder cone, Volcano Mountain. A volcanic field in south-central Yukon is called Alligator Lake volcanic complex. It contains two well-preserved cinder cones that caps a small shield volcano. Lava from the cones travelled north and were erupted at the same time. Volcanoes in south-western Yukon are part of the Wrangle Volcanic Field, which is related to the subduction of the Pacific Plate beneath the North American Plate at the easternmost end of the Avalanche Trench.

Yukon volcanoes include:

Volcano Mountain
Alligator Lake volcanic complex
Fort Selkirk Volcanic Field
Pelly Formation
Bennett Lake Caldera
Sifton Range volcanic complex
Rabbit Mountain
Felsite Peak
Ibex Mountain
Mount McNeil
Miles Canyon Basalts
Ne Ch'e Ddhawa
Skukum Group
Upper Becker Creek Cone

Mountain ranges 
The Saint Elias mountains are part of the Coast Mountains which range from southern British Columbia to Alaska and cover the southwestern Yukon. While the Saint Elias Mountains contain the highest mountains, there are numerous other mountain ranges, from the British Mountains in the far north and the Richardson Mountains in the northeast, both of which are part of the Brooks Range, to the Selwyn Mountains and Mackenzie Mountains in the east, the Cassiar Mountains in the south-east, the Pelly Mountains in the central Yukon, and the Ogilvie Mountains north
of Dawson City and along the Dempster Highway.

Yukon mountain ranges include:
Brooks Range (mostly in northern Alaska)
British Mountains, Yukon
Richardson Mountains, Yukon
Cassiar Mountains, British Columbia and Yukon
Mackenzie Mountains, Northwest Territories and Yukon
Logan Mountains, Yukon
Selwyn Mountains, Yukon
Hess Mountains, Yukon
Nadaleen Range, Yukon
Bonnet Plume Range, Yukon
Wernecke Mountains, Yukon
Knorr Range, Yukon
Pacific Coast Ranges, Mexico to Alaska
Coast Mountains, also in British Columbia and Alaska Panhandle
Saint Elias Mountains, southern Alaska, Yukon and British Columbia
Kluane Ranges, Yukon
Alsek Ranges, Yukon, British Columbia and Alaska
Yukon Ranges
Anvil Range
Dawson Range
Miners Range, Yukon
Nisling Range
Ogilvie Mountains, Yukon
Nahoni Range
Pelly Mountains, Yukon
Big Salmon Range, Yukon
Glenlyon Range
Saint Cyr Range
Ruby Range, Yukon

Highest mountains

Hydrography 
See also: List of Yukon lakes and List of Yukon rivers

Most of the territory is in the watershed of its namesake, the Yukon River, which flows into the Bering Sea. Southern Yukon is dotted with a large number of large, long and narrow glacier-fed alpine lakes, most of which flow into the Yukon River system. The larger lakes include: Teslin Lake, Atlin Lake, Tagish Lake, Marsh Lake, Lake Laberge, Kusawa Lake, Kluane Lake. Bennett Lake on the Klondike Gold Rush trail is a smaller lake flowing into Tagish Lake.

Other rivers flow either directly into the Pacific Ocean or directly or indirectly into the Arctic Ocean. The Alsek-Tatshenshini drainage flows directly into the Pacific from southwestern Yukon. A number of rivers in northern Yukon flow directly into the Arctic Ocean. The two main Yukon rivers flowing into the Mackenzie River in the Northwest Territories are the Liard River in the southeast and the Peel River and its tributaries in the northeast.

Climate 

Most of Yukon has a subarctic climate (Köppen climate classification Dfc), characterized by long cold winters and brief warm summers. The airstrip at Snag, 25 kilometres east of Beaver Creek near the Alaska border, experienced the lowest ever temperature measured in North America, -63.0 °C (-81.4 °F) on February 3, 1947. The Arctic Ocean coast has a Tundra climate (ET). The climate is generally very dry, with little precipitation, but is considerably wetter in the southeast. Precipitation is much greater in the mountains, and the snowpack continues to melt well into the summer, resulting in high water in July or August.

Source: Environment Canada

Ecology 
Except for the Arctic Ocean coastal plain and high elevations, most of Yukon is in the boreal forest ecoregion. Most mountain peaks and higher elevations are characterized by Alpine tundra while the coastal plain is Arctic coastal tundra. More precisely, according to Environment Canada's ecozone definitions, southern and central Yukon is part of the Boreal Cordillera Ecozone while the northern forest is part of the Taiga Cordillera Ecozone. The Peel River area in the northeast is in the Taiga Plains Ecozone and the Arctic coast is in the Southern Arctic Ecozone.

Plants 
Black spruce (Picea mariana), white spruce (Picea glauca), quaking aspen (Populus tremuloides) and balsam poplar (Populus balsamifera) are found throughout much of the territory. Although relatively uncommon, the Alaska birch (Betula neoalaskana) is also found in most areas. The lodgepole pine (Pinus contorta) reaches its northern extreme in the south-central part of the territory, while tamarack (Larix laricina) is found in the southeast and the subalpine fir (Abies lasiocarpa) is found at higher elevations in the southern part of the territory.

Animals 
The large mammals found throughout the territory include caribou (Rangifer tarandus, both barren-ground and woodland), moose (Alces alces), wolves (Canis lupus), grizzly bears (Ursus arctos horribilis) and American black bears (Ursus americanus). Higher elevation have Dall sheep (Ovis dalli) and, in the south, Rocky Mountain goat (Oreamnos americanus). Polar bears (Ursus maritimus) are found on the Arctic coast. The mule deer (Odocoileus hermionus) and its predator, the cougar (Puma concolor), are becoming increasingly common in the south, and coyotes (Canis latrans) are increasing their range to the northern Yukon. Elk (Cervus canadensis) and wood bison (Bison bison athabascae) are also present.

There are many species of rodents, including squirrels, ground squirrels, lemmings, pikas, beavers, various voles, porcupines, muskrats, etc. Mustelids are also well represented and include the wolverine (Gulo gulo), Pacific marten (Martes caurina), American ermine (Mustela richardsonii), least weasel (Mustela nivalis), American mink (Neogale vison), and the river otter (Lontra canadensis). Other small carnivores present are the Canada lynx (Lynx canadensis), red fox ( Vulpes vulpes) and Arctic fox (Vulpes lagopus) along the northern coast.

More than 250 species of birds have been sighted in Yukon. The common raven (Corvus corax) is the territorial bird and is common everywhere. Other common resident birds include bald eagles (Haliaeetus leucocephalus), golden eagles (Aquila chrysaetos),  gyrfalcon (Falco rusticolus) and peregrine falcon (Falco peregrinus), five species of grouse (spruce grouse, blue grouse, ruffed grouse, ptarmigan, and white-tailed ptarmigan). Many migratory birds breed in the Yukon, as it is at the northern end of the Pacific Flyway.

Other than the burbot and northern pike, most of the large fish found in Yukon rivers, lakes and streams are salmonids. Four species of Pacific salmon (Chinook, sockeye, coho and chum) breed in Yukon rivers and lakes in the Pacific and Yukon River watersheds. The Yukon River has the longest freshwater migration route of any salmon; Chinook salmon swim over 3,000 kilometres from its mouth in the Bering Sea to spawning grounds upstream of Whitehorse. There are also land-locked kokanee (sockeye salmon) and rainbow trout. chars are represented by lake trout present in most large Yukon lakes, as well as Dolly Varden, bull trout and Arctic char. The Arctic grayling is ubiquitous, while the lakes have various whitefish and inconnu.

There are no reptiles in Yukon, but a few frogs.

Human geography 
Yukon is sparsely populated, with about 30,000 inhabitants in a territory almost as large as Spain or Sweden. Population density is 0.06 people per km2. Close to three quarters of the population is in the Whitehorse area, and the rest live in a number of other communities. All except Old Crow are accessible by road.

The capital, Whitehorse, is also the largest city with more than two thirds of the population; the second largest is Dawson City, (pop. 1800) which was the capital until 1952.

Traditionally, Yukon was inhabited by nomadic Athapaskan-speaking First Nations people who had established extensive trading networks with the Pacific Coast Tlingit. The interior people traded copper, furs and meat for coastal products such as eulachon oil. About 20% of the Yukon population is of aboriginal origin.

There is no Inuit population in Yukon, although there was a population along the Arctic Ocean coast within historic times. The Inuit were decimated by disease and disappeared in the 19th century. In 1984, the Government of Canada included the Yukon North Slope within the Inuvialuit Settlement Region under the auspices of the Inuvialuit.

The following table presents the population of most Yukon communities. Note that the Census data represents those people who lived within the community boundaries, while the Yukon Bureau of Statistics (YBS) includes everyone with a postal address in the community. Typically, many people live immediately outside the community boundaries, hence the larger YBS numbers.

Notes:
 1 Part of Whitehorse Census Agglomeration
 2 Includes the town and adjoining First Nations settlements of Upper Liard and Two and One-Half Mile Village.
 3 Includes both the Village of Teslin and the adjoining reserve
 4 Includes both the settlement and the adjoining Reserve

Natural resources 
Yukon has abundant mineral resources and mining was the mainstay of the economy until recently. Abundant gold was found in the Klondike region leading to the Klondike Gold Rush of 1898. Placer gold is found in many streams and rivers, and there is an active placer mining industry in the Klondike and many other parts of Yukon to this day.

Other minerals that have been actively mined include copper in the Whitehorse area, lead and zinc in Faro, silver, zinc and lead in the Mayo/Keno City area, asbestos in Clinton Creek, and copper, gold, and coal in the Carmacks area. The world's largest known deposit of tungsten is in the Macmillan Pass area in the Mackenzie Mountains near the Northwest Territories border. Non-metallic minerals mined have included jade and barite.

The  fur trade was very important to the Yukon First Nation economy, but low prices and the impact of animal rights activists have devastated the traditional economy.

There are three hydroelectric generating stations in Yukon: one at Schwatka Lake in Whitehorse, another near Mayo and a third on Aishihik Lake.

While Yukon is mostly covered with forests, most of the trees are small and take a long time to grow and regenerate because of the dry cold climate. There is a considerable amount of small scale logging, but the only area that can sustain industrial forestry is in the southeast with its wetter climate. However, distance from markets and fluctuating prices have resulted in a boom-and-bust industry.

A small amount of natural gas is currently produced in the southeast, but little exploration has been done in other parts of the Yukon. It is believed that there are abundant natural gas fields in the Eagle Plains area along the Dempster Highway and possibly in the Whitehorse area, but distance from pipelines has hampered exploration.

Environmental issues 
Global warming is affecting the north more than other parts of the world and Yukon is no exception. While residents might welcome warmer temperatures, the ultimate effects are not known. Higher temperatures would mean more evaporation and drying out an already dry climate, resulting in more forest fires and reducing the biological productivity of boreal forests, whose growth is limited more by lack of moisture than temperature. Also glaciers are likely to melt, and permafrost likely to thaw.

Yukon is also the recipient of airborne pollutants from other parts of the world, especially persistent organic pollutants. Consumption of the liver of certain wild animals and fish is no longer recommended because of these.

Locally, mine reclamation and dealing with mine tailings that cause acid mine drainage left over from mine closures is a major problem and is likely to cost hundreds of millions of dollars to clean up.

In an effort to encourage natural resource exploration, the previous (2002–2011) Yukon Party government led by Dennis Fentie has suspended the application of the Protected Areas Strategy (established by a previous Yukon New Democratic Party government) and has indicated its intention of not creating additional protected areas or parks.

The Gwichʼin people of Old Crow are dependent on the Porcupine caribou herd for food and clothing, as are others in the Yukon. The Porcupine caribou herd migrates to the coastal plain in the Arctic National Wildlife Refuge (ANWR) in Alaska to give birth. That herd may be seriously threatened by oil-drilling in the ANWR.

References

A.W.F. Banfield (1974). The Mammals of Canada. University of Toronto Press. 
Ken S. Coates and William R. Morrison (1988). Land of the Midnight Sun: A History of the Yukon.  Hurtig Publishers, Edmonton. 
William J. Cody (1996). Flora of the Yukon Territory. NRC Research Press, Ottawa.  (Hardcover),  (Softcover).
Environment Canada, Pacific and Yukon Region Ecozones and Ecoregions
Environment Canada, Canadian Climate Normals or Averages 1971-2000
Pamela H. Sinclair, Wendy A. Nixon, Cameron D. Eckert, and Nancy L. Hughes, Eds. (2003). Birds of the Yukon Territory.  University of British Columbia Press, Vancouver, British Columbia. .
Statistics Canada, 2001 Census 
Yukon Department of the Environment, Yukon State of the Environment Reports, various years (1995–2002)
Yukon Geological Survey, Yukon Geoprocess File User Guide (PDF file, 1.2MB)
Yukon Bureau of Statistics, Population Report, June 2005
Yukon Bureau of Statistics, Yukon Fact Sheet 2003

External links
 Yukon Geological Survey
 Whitefish fossil grants scientific wishes
 Environment Canada, Pacific and Yukon Region Ecozones and Ecoregions

'''